WOTM-LD is a low-power independent television station in Montevallo, Alabama, broadcasting in the Birmingham, Alabama market on channel 19.

WOTM-LD is carried by Charter Cable in the Birmingham market. It carries a number of locally produced television shows such as View Point, Central Alabama Sports Show, Sportz Blitz, and the Pelham High School Football Review. Additionally, WOTM broadcasts local high school football games and University of Alabama football games on a tape delay basis. In 2009, it hosted a weekly hour-long program by Alabama State Senator Hank Erwin.

WOTM-LD carries a mix of high school sports, televangelism, programs shared with WOIL-CD and WEAC-CD, and some programming from NewsNet.

References

External links

OTM-LD
Low-power television stations in the United States